The Jahnulales are an order of fungi in the class Dothideomycetes, subclass Pleosporomycetidae. They are ascomycetes that have stalked/stessile and dimorphic ascomata, hyphal stalk cells that are about 40 μm wide.  It contains the families Aliquandostipitaceae, and Manglicolaceae.

References

External links

 
Ascomycota orders